Alandson Jansen da Silva (born 4 October 1988) is a Belgian professional footballer who plays for Gent-Zeehaven.

Career
Jansen da Silva and his one-year older brother Alexandre have Brazilian parents but grew up in Waregem, West Flanders. Alandson made his professional debut for AGOVV Apeldoorn in the 2011–12 season.

References

External links
Alandson da Silva at Footballdatabase

1988 births
Living people
Belgian footballers
A.F.C. Tubize players
AGOVV Apeldoorn players
Floriana F.C. players
Challenger Pro League players
Eerste Divisie players
Belgian expatriate footballers
Expatriate footballers in the Netherlands
Belgian expatriate sportspeople in the Netherlands
Expatriate footballers in Malta
Association football forwards
People from Torhout
People from Waregem
Belgian people of Brazilian descent
Footballers from West Flanders
K.R.C. Gent players